The Late Pleistocene is an unofficial age in the international geologic timescale in chronostratigraphy, also known as Upper Pleistocene from a stratigraphic perspective. It is intended to be the fourth division of the Pleistocene Epoch within the ongoing Quaternary Period. It is currently defined as the time between c. 129,000 and c. 11,700 years ago. The Late Pleistocene equates to the proposed Tarantian Age of the geologic time scale, preceded by the officially ratified Chibanian (commonly known as Middle Pleistocene) and succeeded by the officially ratified Greenlandian. The estimated beginning of the Tarantian is the start of the Eemian interglacial period (Marine Isotope Stage 5). It is held to end with the termination of the Younger Dryas, some 11,700 years ago when the Holocene Epoch began.

The term Upper Pleistocene is currently in use as a provisional or "quasi-formal" designation by the International Union of Geological Sciences (IUGS). Although the three oldest ages of the Pleistocene (the Gelasian, the Calabrian and the Chibanian) have been officially defined, the Late Pleistocene has yet to be formally defined, along with consideration of a proposed Anthropocene sub-division of the Holocene.

The main feature of the Late Pleistocene was glaciation, for example the Würm glaciation in the Alps of Europe, to 14 ka, and the subsequent Younger Dryas. Many megafauna became extinct during this age, a trend that continued into the Holocene. In palaeoanthropology, the Late Pleistocene contains the Upper Palaeolithic stage of human development, including many of the early human migrations and the extinction of the last remaining archaic human species.

Last Ice Age

The proposed beginning of the Late Pleistocene is the end of the Penultimate Glacial Period (PGP) 126 ka when the Riß glaciation (Alpine) was being succeeded by the Eemian (Riß-Würm) interglacial period. The Riß-Würm ended 115 ka with the onset of the Last Glacial Period (LGP) which is known in Europe as the Würm (Alpine) or Devensian (Great Britain) or Weichselian glaciation (northern Europe); these are broadly equated with the Wisconsin glaciation (North America), though technically that began much later.

The Last Glacial Maximum was reached during the later millennia of the Würm/Weichselian, estimated between 26 ka and 19 ka when deglaciation began in the Northern Hemisphere. The Würm/Weichselian endured until 16 ka with Northern Europe, including most of Great Britain, covered by an ice sheet. The glaciers reached the Great Lakes in North America. Sea levels fell and two land bridges were temporarily in existence that had significance for human migration: Doggerland, which connected Great Britain to mainland Europe; and the Bering land bridge which joined Alaska to Siberia.

The Last Ice Age was followed by the Late Glacial Interstadial, a period of global warming to 12.9 ka, and the Younger Dryas, a return to glacial conditions until 11.7 ka. Palaeoclimatology holds that there was a sequence of stadials and interstadials from about 16 ka until the end of the Pleistocene. These were the Oldest Dryas (stadial), the Bølling oscillation (interstadial), the Older Dryas (stadial), the Allerød oscillation (interstadial) and finally the Younger Dryas.

The end of the Younger Dryas marks the boundary between the Pleistocene and Holocene Epochs. Man in all parts of the world was still culturally and technologically in the Palaeolithic (Old Stone) Age. Tools and weapons were basic stone or wooden implements. Nomadic tribes followed moving herds. Non-nomadics acquired their food by gathering and hunting.

Africa
In Egypt, the Late (or Upper) Palaeolithic began sometime after 30,000 BC. People in North Africa had relocated to the Nile Valley as the Sahara was transformed from grassland to desert. The Nazlet Khater skeleton was found in 1980 and has been radiocarbon dated to between 30,360 and 35,100 years ago.

Eurasia
Neanderthal hominins (Homo neanderthalensis) inhabited Eurasia until becoming extinct between 40 and 30 ka. Towards the end of the Pleistocene and possibly into the early Holocene, several large mammalian species including the woolly rhinoceros, mammoth, mastodon and Irish elk became extinct.

Cave paintings have been found at Lascaux in the Dordogne which may be more than 17,000 years old. These are mainly of buffalo, deer and other animals hunted by man. Later paintings occur in caves throughout the world with further examples at Altamira (Spain) and in India, Australia and the Sahara.

Magdalenian hunter-gatherers were widespread in western Europe about 18,000 years ago until the end of the Pleistocene. They invented the earliest known harpoons using reindeer horn.

The only domesticated animal in the Pleistocene was the dog, which evolved from the grey wolf into its many modern breeds. It is believed that the grey wolf became associated with hunter-gatherer tribes around 15 ka. The earliest remains of a true domestic dog have been dated to 14,200 years ago. Domestication first happened in Eurasia but could have been anywhere from Western Europe to East Asia. Domestication of other animals such as cattle, goats, pigs and sheep did not begin until the Holocene when settled farming communities became established in the Near East. The cat was probably not domesticated before c. 7500 BC at the earliest, again in the Near East.

A butchered brown bear patella found in Alice and Gwendoline Cave in County Clare and dated to 10,860 to 10,641 BC indicates the first known human activity in Ireland.

Far East
The very first human habitation in the Japanese archipelago has been traced to prehistoric times between 40,000 BC and 30,000 BC. The earliest fossils are radiocarbon dated to c. 35,000 BC. Japan was once linked to the Asian mainland by land bridges via Hokkaido and Sakhalin Island to the north, but was unconnected at this time when the main islands of Hokkaido, Honshu, Kyushu and Shikoku were all separate entities.

North America

From about 28 ka, there were migrations across the Bering land bridge from Siberia to Alaska. The people became the Native Americans. It is believed that the original tribes subsequently moved down to Central and South America under pressure from later migrations.

In the North American land mammal age scale, the Rancholabrean spans the time from c. 240,000 years ago to c. 11,000 years ago. It is named after the Rancho La Brea fossil site in California, characterised by extinct forms of bison in association with other Pleistocene species such as the mammoth.

Bison occidentalis and Bison antiquus, an extinct subspecies of the smaller present-day bison, survived the Late Pleistocene period, between about 12 and 11 ka ago. Clovis peoples depended on these bison as their major food source. Earlier kills of camels, horses, and muskoxen found at Wally's beach were dated to 13.1–13.3 ka B.P.

South America 

The South American land mammal age Lujanian corresponds with the Late Pleistocene.

Oceania
There is evidence of human habitation in mainland Australia, Indonesia, New Guinea and Tasmania from c. 45,000 BC. The finds include rock engravings, stone tools and evidence of cave habitation.

References

Bibliography

Further reading
 Ehlers, J., and P.L. Gibbard, 2004a, Quaternary Glaciations: Extent and Chronology 2: Part II North America. Elsevier, Amsterdam. 
 Ehlers, J., and P L. Gibbard, 2004b, Quaternary Glaciations: Extent and Chronology 3: Part III: South America, Asia, Africa, Australia, Antarctica. 
 Frison, George C., Prehistoric Human and Bison Relationships on the Plains of North America, August 2000, International Bison Conference, Edmonton, Alberta.
 Gillespie, A. R., S. C. Porter, and B. F. Atwater, 2004, The Quaternary Period in the United States.  Developments in Quaternary Science no. 1. Elsevier, Amsterdam. 
 Mangerud, J., J. Ehlers, and P. Gibbard, 2004, Quaternary Glaciations : Extent and Chronology 1: Part I Europe. Elsevier, Amsterdam.  
 Sibrava, V., Bowen, D. Q., and Richmond, G. M., 1986, Quaternary Glaciations in the Northern Hemisphere, Quaternary Science Reviews. vol. 5, pp. 1–514.

 
03
Pleistocene geochronology
Quaternary geochronology
Geological ages